A Yamari (གཤིན་རྗེ་གཤེད shin je she in Tibetan) is a yidam or meditation deity of the Anuttara Yoga Tantra method (father) classification. The Word यमारि yamāri in Sanskrit means Yama's Enemy There are three types of Yamari:
 Krishna Yamari (shin je she nag in Tibetan)
 Rakta Yamari (shin je she mar in Tibetan and ‘the Red Enemy of Death’ in English)
Yamantaka (གཤིན་རྗེ་གཤེད gshin rje gshed in Tibetan) sometimes referred to as Vajrabhairava (རྡོ་རྗེ་འཇིགས་བྱེད། dor je jig je in Tibetan)

References
 Chandra, Lokesh & Fredrick W. Bunce, The Tibetan Iconography of Buddhas, Bodhisattvas and other Deities: A Unique Pantheon, New Delhi, D.K. Printworld, 2002, 98.

Buddhist deities
Buddhist tantras
Yidams